Minuscule 2612 (in the Gregory-Aland numbering), is a Greek minuscule manuscript of the New Testament, on 184 parchment leaves (19.5 cm by 14.5 cm). Dated paleographically to the 13th century.

Description 
The codex contains text of the four Gospels. The text is written in one column per page, in 21-28 lines per page.

The codex contains the text of the four Gospels, in the order: Mark, Luke, John, and Matthew.

Text 

The Greek text of the codex, is a representative of the Byzantine text-type. Aland did not place it in any Category.
According to the Claremont Profile Method it represents the textual family Kx in Luke 10 and Luke 20. In Luke 10 the manuscript is defective.

History 

The codex now is located in the Kenneth Willis Clark Collection of the Duke University (Gk MS 5)  at Durham.

See also 

 List of New Testament minuscules
 Textual criticism
 Biblical manuscript

References

External links 

 Minuscule 2612 at the Kenneth Willis Clark Collection of Greek Manuscripts 

Minuscule 2612
13th-century biblical manuscripts
Duke University Libraries